Al-Ghassaniyah  is a Syrian village located in Jisr al-Shughur Nahiyah in Jisr al-Shughur District, Idlib.  According to the Syria Central Bureau of Statistics (CBS), al-Ghassaniyah had a population of 389 in the 2004 census. Its inhabitants are predominantly  Greek Orthodox and Catholic Christians.

References 

Populated places in Jisr al-Shughur District
Christian communities in Syria